Labeaume is a commune in the Ardèche department in southern France.

A little different in nature from the other 'villages of character', Labeaume is situated around an open square with a church and has a handful of old streets to explore, with ancient houses lining narrow alleys.

Population

See also
Communes of the Ardèche department

References

Communes of Ardèche
Ardèche communes articles needing translation from French Wikipedia